Heron S.A. is a power company in Greece. It is a joint company of GEK Terna and GDF Suez, established on 11 December 2008.

Heron I 
Heron I is a 147 MW dual-fuel open-cycle gas-turbine plant, which has been in operation since 2004. It was the first private power plant in Greece.

A stand-by diesel generator provides emergency power in case of 20 kV grid power loss. Thus, the power plant is capable of black start operation. The installation also includes:

 Natural gas filtering and pressure reducing station with two streams.
 Natural gas preheating with heat exchanger and two hot water boilers.
 Diesel oil storage facility with capacity 2500 m3 providing inventory for 5 days operation in case that natural gas is not available.
 Raw water storage facility with  tanks and two deep well pumps with capacity 10 m3/m & 20 m3/h each.
 Demineralized water production plant with capacity .
 One 500 m3 carbon steel tank with interior lining and six stainless steel tanks 100 m3 each for the storage of the demineralised water.
 Two fire pump skids for raw and demineralized water. Each skid consists of one diesel pump, one electric driven pump and one jockey pump.
 Fire detection and CO2 fire fighting systems for the gas turbine housings.
 Main control building with 20 and 0.4 kV switch boards, MCCs, UPS and batteries and the central control room of the station.

Heron II 

Heron II is a 435 MW under construction combined cycle gas-fired power plant. It is scheduled to become operational in 2010. The plant includes STAG 109FB GE main equipment in single shaft arrangement using dry low NOx combustion system.

See also

 Energy in Greece

References

Electric power companies of Greece
Natural gas-fired power stations in Greece
Greek brands